The 2010 NRL season was the 103rd season of professional rugby league football club competition in Australia, and the thirteenth run by the National Rugby League. The season commenced on 12 March and ended with the grand final, played on 3 October at ANZ Stadium. Sixteen teams competed for the 2010 Telstra Premiership whilst the third season of the National Youth Competition was also in progress.

The 2010 season was marred by the Melbourne Storm's admission in April of systematically breaching the NRL salary cap. As part of the NRL's imposed penalties, the Storm were deducted all 8 competition points earned at the time of the announcement, and were barred from earning points for the rest of the season, guaranteeing them the wooden spoon. The club was also stripped of all titles earned during the period they were in breach, including their 2007 and 2009 premierships and their 2006, 2007 and 2008 minor premierships, and later also their 2010 World Club Challenge title.

2010's NRL premiership was won by the season's minor premiers the St George Illawarra Dragons, the first title for the joint venture club. The Dragons became the first minor premiers since the Penrith Panthers in 2003 to complete the minor premiership and premiership double.

Season summary

During the pre-season the Melbourne Storm defeated the Leeds Rhinos 18–10 in the 2010 World Club Challenge. The inaugural All Stars match took place on 13 February at Skilled Park, Gold Coast, where the Indigenous All Stars team won 16–12.

Significant dates throughout the season include the annual ANZAC Test and City vs Country Origin weekend, resulting in a shortened round in early May. Byes take place throughout the State of Origin period between Rounds 11 and 18 (during June and July). The annual heritage round takes place again in Round 10, a round celebrating Women in League has been earmarked for Round 16, and later in the season a round has been set aside to celebrate Indigenous Australians.

For the second successive year the St. George Illawarra Dragons took out the JJ Giltinan Shield for winning the minor premiership.

The overall attendance record during the regular season was 3,151,039, an increase on last year's record of 3,081,874. This was the second consecutive year that the rugby league attendance record has been broken.

On 7 September 2010, Sydney Roosters' five-eighth Todd Carney won the coveted Dally M Medal for Player of the Year for season 2010 and was also awarded the people's choice Provan-Summons award (see 2010 Dally M Awards for full award listing). It was a remarkable return to the field for Carney who in 2008 was sacked by the Canberra Raiders and deregistered by the NRL for the 2009 season for repeated off-field indiscretions.

In 2010, NRL games on New Zealand's Sky network drew average audiences of 60,779.

Rule changes

During the 2010 season, a rule change to the playing field was implemented so that if a player in possession of the ball made contact with the corner post that player would no longer be considered to be touch in-goal. Proponents of the move argued a series of possible future scenarios made this preventative measure necessary, with ARL chief executive Geoff Carr stating, "no one has thought of the possibility of using the corner post as a weapon to defuse a try and we want to stop it before they do". One scenario was that a defending player might manipulate the corner post to put an attacker out of play. Another concern cited was that the corner post might be made to make contact with a rolling ball to ensure the defending team gains possession with a 20-metre restart. Corner posts, which sometimes lean to one side, have no upper height limit set and this led to a fear that corner posts might become "long rubber snakes, biting attackers and sending them into touch", in the words of Roy Masters. Other laws concerning the corner posts remained unchanged. A ball that makes contact with the corner post while not in the possession of a player will be deemed to be touch in-goal as before. There was no attempt to remove the corner posts from the playing field as they are used to promote sponsors and are also a useful aid for players to judge their kicks. The change was agreed by the NRL Board and approved by the RLIF as an experimental rule. Implementation occurred mid-season following feedback from clubs.

Melbourne Storm salary cap breach

On 22 April, Melbourne Storm officials confessed to the NRL that the club had committed serious and systematic breaches of the salary cap regulations for the last five years by running a well-organized dual contract and bookkeeping system which left the NRL unable to know of $3.17 million in payments made to players outside of the salary cap, including $550,000 in 2007, $965,000 in 2009 and $1.03 million in 2010.

As a result of this confession, the following penalties were imposed by the NRL:
 The Storm were stripped of their 2007 and 2009 premierships and their 2006–2008 minor premierships; these titles will be withheld, rather than be awarded to the respective grand finalists (Manly & Parramatta) and runners-up. The Storm however were allowed to keep the 2010 World Club Challenge title that they won two months earlier, until this was stripped thirteen months later.
 The Storm were fined a record $1.689 million: $1.1 million in prize money which will be distributed equally between the remaining 15 clubs, $89,000 in prize money from the World Club Challenge which will be distributed to the Leeds Rhinos, and the maximum of $500,000 for breaching the salary cap regulations.
 The Storm were ordered to cut their payroll by $1,012,500 by 31 December; failure to do so would have resulted in the club being suspended from the 2011 season.
 The Storm were deducted all eight competition points received during the 2010 season and barred from receiving premiership points for the remainder of the season.

The Storm accepted this decision without question; however, the former directors of the club took legal action which later collapsed. The matter has been referred to ASIC, Australian Tax Office, the Victorian State Revenue Office, and the Victoria Police.

Melbourne eventually finished the 2010 season with a 14–10 win–loss record, which would have seen them finish 5th disregarding the punishments, with Manly missing the finals. Statistically, the North Queensland Cowboys were the poorest performing team during the season, winning only five of its 24 matches played which, disregarding the Storm's punishment, would have been their first wooden spoon since 2000.

Season advertising
A new approach was taken in 2010 following the controversies of 2009 wherein marquee players Greg Inglis (who had featured in the season launch ad) and Brett Stewart (who had been the face of a season launch event) were charged with assault thus disempowering the message behind the ad. The NRL and their advertising agency MJW Hakuhodo set about presenting the acceptable face of Australian rugby league to the world and interspersed some sparse action shots with a gallery of characters to assure viewers that league is a family-friendly sport watched by everyman.

For the first time in many years the launch commercial did not use a popular soundtrack. Titled, the "Voices of the Game" the ad set out to show the diversity of rugby league's appeal featuring fans from all walks of life including a rodeo clown, a sculptor, a farmer, a businessman and Australian Paralympian Kurt Fearnley The proposition was that "this season, many of you will....see/ feel/ experience/ dream/ hurt/ believe". The fans highlighted ticked all the boxes of a diverse but wholesome audience demographic. Veteran Kangaroo captain Darren Lockyer is the only player to appear with a speaking part.

Teams
The number of teams in the NRL remains unchanged since the previous season, with sixteen participating in the regular season: ten from New South Wales, three from Queensland and one from each of Victoria, the Australian Capital Territory and New Zealand. Of the ten from New South Wales, eight are from Sydney's metropolitan area, with St. George-Illawarra being a Sydney and Wollongong joint venture. Just two foundation clubs from New South Wales Rugby League season 1908 played in this competition: the Sydney Roosters (formerly known as Eastern Suburbs) and the South Sydney Rabbitohs.

Ladder

Finals Series

To decide the grand finalists from the top eight finishing teams, the NRL adopts the McIntyre final eight system.

Only three teams from 2009's finals series made an appearance in the 2010 finals race: St George Illawarra Dragons, Gold Coast Titans and Manly-Warringah Sea Eagles, with only the Dragons managing to not drop positions from last year. Major improvements saw the Canberra Raiders, New Zealand Warriors and Sydney Roosters make a return to the finals after finishing 13th, 14th and last in 2009. This season also saw the Wests Tigers and Penrith Panthers make their long-awaited return to the finals race, with the Tigers last featuring in their grand final year of 2005 whilst the Panthers last appeared in the 2004 season. This was one of the 3 seasons where Melbourne were not in the finals and currently the last where they've missed the finals and it was also the first since 1991 which did not feature Brisbane.

† Match decided in golden point extra time.

Grand Final

Team and player records
The following statistics are correct as of the conclusion of Round 26.

Top 5 point scorers

Top 5 try scorers

Top 5 goal scorers

Most points in a match by an individual

Most tries in a match by an individual

Most points in a match

Fewest points in a match

Most points scored in a match by an individual team

Paul Gallen ran 4,056 metres with the ball in 2010, more than any other player in the competition.

Attendances
The 2010 regular season attendance figures bettered last year's figures of 3,081,849 to become the highest attended regular season in Australia's rugby league history, with a total of 3,151,039. Along with 2009, the 2010 season also outshone other attendance blockbuster years of 2007 and the 1995 Winfield Cup.

The highest twenty regular season match attendances:

2010 Transfers

Players

Coaches

See also
2010 NRL All Stars Game
2010 State of Origin series
2010 NRL season results
2010 NRL Under-20s season
2010 in rugby league
2010 World Club Challenge
2010 Dally M Awards

References

External links
State of the Game 2010 report by the National Rugby League